Andrew Richard Danson (born 25 October 1978) is an English former first-class cricketer.

Danson was born at the Nether Edge Hospital in Sheffield in October 1978. He was educated at Birkdale School, before going up to Pembroke College, Cambridge. While studying at Cambridge, he played first-class cricket for Cambridge University Cricket Club in 1999 and 2000, making twelve appearances. Playing as an all-rounder, he scored 364 runs in his twelve matches, at an average of 28.00. He scored one century, a score of 117 not out against Derbyshire at Fenner's in 2000. With his medium pace bowling, he took 8 wickets with best figures of 3 for 20. 

After graduating from Cambridge, Danson became a lawyer. As of 2022 he works with the law firm Bird & Bird, specialising in law on sports and gambling.

References

External links

1978 births
Living people
Cricketers from Sheffield
People educated at Birkdale School
Alumni of Pembroke College, Cambridge
English cricketers
Cambridge University cricketers
English lawyers